Fässbergs IF is a Swedish football club, founded in 1916. They are based in Mölndal, near Gothenburg. The team won the Svenska Mästerskapet in 1924.

Background
Fässbergs IF was formed on 24 April 1916 by the Krokslätts IK, Mölndals IS and IK Celtic clubs. Historically, the first team has usually played in Division III and IV of the Swedish football league system. The club's greatest achievement was way back in 1924 when they won the Svenska Mästerskapet by beating IK Sirius 5–0 in the final. This was the last time that the Swedish Championship was played as a cup competition. The club were not permitted to join the Allsvenskan for 1924/25.  The club currently plays in Division 2 Västra Götaland (2013), which is the fourth tier of Swedish football. They play their home matches at the Åbyvallen in Mölndal.

Fässbergs IF have approximately 500 members. The club are affiliated to the Göteborgs Fotbollförbund.  Fässberg Parish covers most of the town of Mölndal.

Season to season

Attendances

In recent seasons Fässbergs IF have had the following average attendances:

Achievements
Swedish Champions
Winners (1): 1924

Cups
Svenska Mästerskapet:
Winners (1): 1924

Footnotes
A. The title of "Swedish Champions" has been awarded to the winner of four different competitions over the years. Between 1896 and 1925 the title was awarded to the winner of Svenska Mästerskapet, a stand-alone cup tournament. No club were given the title between 1926 and 1930 even though the first-tier league Allsvenskan was played. In 1931 the title was reinstated and awarded to the winner of Allsvenskan. Between 1982 and 1990 a play-off in cup format was held at the end of the league season to decide the champions. After the play-off format in 1991 and 1992 the title was decided by the winner of Mästerskapsserien, an additional league after the end of Allsvenskan. Since the 1993 season the title has once again been awarded to the winner of Allsvenskan.

Notes

External links
 Fässbergs IF – Official website

Football clubs in Gothenburg
Allsvenskan clubs
Association football clubs established in 1916
1916 establishments in Sweden
Football clubs in Västra Götaland County